The Campeonato Argentino de Rugby 1953 was won by the selection of Capital that beat in the final the selection of Buenos Aires Province ("Provincia").
There were the debuts of the selection of Rio Cuarto and San Juan

Rugby Union in Argentina in 1953
 The "Championship of Buenos Aires" was won by Obras Sanitarias 
 The "Cordoba Province Championship" was won by the Escuela de Aviación.
 The "North-East Championship" was won by Tucumán Rugby Club

Knock out stages

Final

Bibliography 
  Memorias de la UAR 1953
  IX Campeonato Argentino

Campeonato Argentino de Rugby
Argentina
Campeonato